is a fictional fairy who acts as series protagonist Link's navigator throughout the 1998 Nintendo 64 video game The Legend of Zelda: Ocarina of Time. She was voiced by Kaori Mizuhashi. Navi performs a variety of functions within the game, including being a companion and guide to Link, providing the player with advice and being a focal point for the game's Z-lock targeting combat system. She has been widely criticised by players and critics for her repetitive interruptions in gameplay, particularly with the prompt "Hey! Listen!".

Concept and creation 
Navi was originally created as a marker for targeting an opponent in battle. Game designer Yoshiaki Koizumi stated in an interview that he wanted to use something more than a simple triangular marker, so he came up with the idea of a fairy. However, due to the limitations of the Nintendo 64, he created the fairy as a ball of light with wings. He named it the "Fairy Navigation System", which led to the character being named Navi, from "navigation". He commented: "I thought, 'This is Navi' and ideas started coming to me one after the other. Like being able to tell by colour whether the person you're facing is good or bad, and if Navi talked, she could be an important guide for the story. So naming the system Navi really helped it grow". Navi was designed as the focal point of the game's Z-lock targeting system, which gives the player the ability to combat more than one enemy at a time by locking on to them using the Z, L, or ZL buttons on the gamepad. Using this system, Link is able to move freely around the enemy's fixed position, with Navi allowing the camera to follow his movements.

Shigeru Miyamoto explained in a strategy guide published by Japanese magazine Famitsu in April 1999 that Navi had been purposefully designed to provide simple advice, due to limited developer time and manpower. This resulted in Navi repeating the same advice throughout the game, which became the main reason for players branding the character as annoying. Miyamoto also considered that Navi's advice was a major weakness of Ocarina of Time: "The truth is I wanted to remove the entire system, but that would have been even more unfriendly to players. You can think of Navi as being there for players who stop playing for a month or so, who then pick the game back up and want to remember what they were supposed to do".

Various concepts were developed for Ocarina of Time and later abandoned. An old Nintendo 64 demo cartridge holding F-Zero X revealed files for a 1997 Zelda demo build, which featured a magical Soul Medallion that gave Link the ability to "become Navi and fly around". The Great Deku Tree had also been originally intended as a prison for fairies, creating the need for Link to save Navi during the game.

In a 2011 interview with Kotaku, director Eiji Aonuma defended Navi when asked if he finds the character annoying: "Going on an adventure by yourself is lonely and dull. Navi may seem "annoying" at times, but it's hard to imagine Ocarina of Time without communication with Navi, and communication partners like Navi have been employed in different forms in subsequent games in the Zelda series".

Portrayal 
In Ocarina of Time, Navi is voiced by Japanese voice actor Kaori Mizuhashi.

Appearances
Navi first appears in The Legend of Zelda: Ocarina of Time. She is instructed by the Great Deku Tree in Kokiri Forest to assist Link in his quest to stop Ganondorf. All Kokiri have companion fairies, but because Link is actually a Hylian, he never received one until Navi joins him near the beginning of the events of the game. In gameplay terms, Navi functions primarily as a guide to Link that helps the player learn the controls and advance in the game. Throughout the game, she offers various advice, such as how to use items or defeat enemies, which is repeatedly preceded by the prompt, "Hey! Listen!". She can also be used to lock onto enemies as part of the game's Z-targeting system.

In the North American release of the spin-off title Hyrule Warriors a fairy makes an appearance named Navi, but is named "fairy" in the European and Japanese editions.

Navi also appears in one of Young Link's taunts in Super Smash Bros. Ultimate where she flies around the character.

In the manga adaptation of Ocarina of Time, Navi is present to offer advice to Link and the story depicts them developing a mutual bond.

Reception

The character drew a strongly negative response from many critics and players. GamesRadar editor Mikel Reparaz ranked Navi as the most irritating female character, stating that she would have been bearable if she did not interrupt the game with "Hey!" and "Listen!" constantly. Fellow GamesRadar editor Tom Goulter listed her as the second most annoying sidekick ever, while in another article, GamesRadar ranked Navi in second place on a list of "cutesy characters [they] want to beat the crap out of", citing similar reasons but describing her as a "tactless Tinkerbell". The website also listed her "Hey! Listen!" quote as one of the 40 most repeated game quotes. GameDaily listed her as one of the characters they wanted to kill, but could not, describing her as irritating. In the book Game Writing: Narrative Skills for Videogames, author Chris Bateman described Navi as the "most famous, and most famously annoying, instance of an explicit funneling companion". In the book The Legend of Zelda and Philosophy, author Luke Cuddy describes Navi as the "most insipid" character next to the character Tingle, but noted that she is seen by the in-game characters as a necessary stage in a Kokiri's life. Zack Zwiezen for Kotaku unfavourably compared the character Fi from Skyward Sword to Navi, commenting, "Being compared to Navi is a good indicator that people don’t like you very much". Camden Jones of GameRevolution considered Navi to be a symptom of the poor direction and difficulty in navigating Ocarina of Time: "She's mostly there to patch up the holes in Ocarina of Time's story, unnaturally telling Link where he'll find the next plot point in lieu of a natural, clever transition from location to location". GameRevolution also included Navi on a list of "the most annoying video game characters ever": "Most of what she says is useless, of course, but sometimes she's genuinely helpful. The player can never really be sure, thus making her a general pain to work with".

In the character's defense, Brendan Main writing for The Escapist argues that while Navi is undeniably annoying, she is also indispensable in the game and extremely useful, citing her role in the Z-targeting system and her role as a gameplay prompt through physically changing colours near secrets and danger. He even goes as far as claiming that Navi is the greatest partner to grace a videogame. IGN's Chris Reed also stressed on her utility and listed her as one of the "best video game wingmen ever", commenting that "she does everything a good sidekick should do: She tells you how to work the game's controls, reminds you what to do next when you forget, and gives you hints when you get stuck". Ryan Lambie writing for Den of Geek included Navi in a list of "The 10 Most Memorable Characters" in The Legend of Zelda: "She may be little more than a point of light with wings, but Navi is nevertheless a recognizable and important character in the Zelda canon".

See also 
 Characters of The Legend of Zelda

Notes

References

Female characters in video games
Fictional fairies and sprites
Nintendo protagonists
The Legend of Zelda characters
Video game characters introduced in 1998
Video game sidekicks